Breckin Erin Meyer (born May 7, 1974) is an American actor, musician, writer and producer, known for his roles in films such as Clueless (1995), Road Trip (2000), Rat Race (2001), and Garfield: The Movie (2004), he's also known for providing voices for the television series Robot Chicken (2005–present) and for voicing Joseph Gribble in King of the Hill (2000–2010). He portrayed lawyer Jared Franklin in Franklin & Bash (2011–2014).

Early life
Meyer was born in Minneapolis, Minnesota, to Dorothy Ann (née Vial), a travel agent and former microbiologist, and Christopher William Meyer, a management consultant. He has lived in California, Texas, West Virginia, and New Jersey. He has an older brother, Frank, and a younger brother, Adam. Meyer attended elementary school with Drew Barrymore (and was apparently her first kiss) and also attended Beverly Hills High School. Through his elementary school, he came into contact with Barrymore's agent, who signed Meyer. As a little boy, he was mostly seen in television advertisements, and also appeared as a child participant in the game show Child's Play.  He also slept in a closed coffin for several years in high school.

Career
Meyer played several roles as a druggie, starting with his debut in Freddy's Dead: The Final Nightmare (1991), in which he was dispatched in a video game. His breakthrough screen role was in the teen hit Clueless (1995) as the skateboarding stoner. Meyer offered similar characterizations in The Craft and John Carpenter's Escape from L.A. (both 1996). He played the best friend of an Olympic hopeful in the biopic Prefontaine (1997) and a high-school student yearning to leave his hometown in Dancer, Texas Pop. 81 (1998).

In 54 (also 1998), a look at life in the famous '70s nightspot Studio 54, the actor was cast as a busboy married to the coat check girl (Salma Hayek) and pursued by a bartender (Ryan Phillippe). Meyer is close friends with Phillippe, with whom he and Seth Green share a production company.

Meyer would subsequently appear in films including Go (1999) and The Insider (1999) before graduating to a full-fledged leading role in the DreamWorks hit Road Trip (2000), in which he again played a character traveling cross country, a college student hoping desperately to retrieve a videotape of himself having sex with another girl, which was accidentally mailed to his long-distance girlfriend.

He re-teamed with Amy Smart in yet another racing cross country film, this time as part of the multi-plot ensemble of Rat Race (2001), a sort-of homage to the all-star screwball chase films of the 1960s, such as It's a Mad, Mad, Mad, Mad World. Meyer put in a supporting turn as Meg Ryan's character's brother in the whimsical fantasy-comedy Kate & Leopold (2001). Meyer also took on the role of Jon Arbuckle, the hapless owner of the famed comic strip cat in the film adaptation of Garfield (2004).

Meyer also starred in Blue State (2007) with Anna Paquin in which he plays a passionately liberal guy on the campaign trail for John Kerry in the 2004 elections. He drunkenly pledges to move to Canada if Bush wins the election, and on his journey meets a mysterious young woman, played by Paquin. He co-starred with Matthew McConaughey in Ghosts of Girlfriends Past (2009). Meyer starred opposite Emily Kinney and Giselle Eisenberg in the independent dark comedy The Enormity of Life (2021) about a suicidal man struggling with life and love. 

Meyer regularly does writing and voice work on Robot Chicken, and was nominated for an Emmy for his writing on the Robot Chicken: Star Wars specials. He also voiced the adolescent Joseph Gribble on the animated series King of the Hill and starred on the Adult Swim series Titan Maximum. 

Meyer is also a musician, playing drums in the punk band The Street Walkin' Cheetahs and with Tom Morello's The Nightwatchman, as well as Ben Harper, Cypress Hill, Slash and Perry Farrell at L.A.'s Hotel Café.

Meyer is the drummer for Tom Morello's alter ego The Nightwatchman's back-up band The Freedom Fighter Orchestra. He toured with Morello on The Nightwatchman's 2008 Justice Tour. He appears in Street Sweeper Social Club's video for "100 Little Curses" and "Promenade".

Personal life
Meyer married screenwriter and film director Deborah Kaplan on October 14, 2001, and has two daughters with her. They divorced in 2014. 

His brother, Frank Meyer, is a staffer and producer of Fresh Ink Online at G4tv.com.

Filmography

Film

Television

Video games

References

External links

 
 

1974 births
Living people
American male child actors
American male film actors
American male screenwriters
American male television actors
American male voice actors
American producers
Annie Award winners
Male actors from Minneapolis
20th-century American male actors
21st-century American male actors